"Let's Stay Home Tonight" is a song by American R&B singer Joe. It was written by Johnta Austin, Joel Campbell, and Allen "Allstar" Gordon for his fourth studio album Better Days (2001). Gordon served as the song's producer, with Campbell providing additional production. Released as the album's lead single only twelve months after the success of his number-one single "Stutter", "Let's Stay Home Tonight" underperformed on the charts, reaching number 68 on the US Billboard Hot 100 and number 18 on the Hot R&B/Hip-Hop Songs chart in December 2001, becoming Joe's lowest-charting lead single up to that point.This song was also inspired by the September 11th attacks. With him by shook up by the attacks, he wrote the song in the sense he wants to stay in and not want to go out.

The song heavily interpolates Sexual Healing by Marvin Gaye.

Charts

Weekly charts

Year-end charts

References

2001 singles
2001 songs
Joe (singer) songs
Jive Records singles
Songs written by Johntá Austin